Mesonoemacheilus menoni is a species of ray-finned fish in the genus Mesonoemacheilus. It is endemic to the southern Western Ghats in Kerala, India, where it occurs in the upper reaches of the Periyar River over substrates of cobbles, pebbles and sand in flowing water. It is common within the Periyar Tiger Reserve but may be threatened by predation and competition from the invasive African cichlid Mozambique tilapia, the common carp and Clarias gariepinus.

References

External links 

Nemacheilidae
Fish described in 1999
Taxobox binomials not recognized by IUCN